Curt Josef Sjöberg (January 26, 1897 – April 12, 1948) was a Swedish gymnast and diver who competed in the 1920 Summer Olympics, in the 1924 Summer Olympics, and in the 1928 Summer Olympics. He was born and died in Stockholm.

Sjöberg was part of the Swedish team, which won the gold medal in the gymnastics men's team, Swedish system event in 1920. In 1924 he finished seventh in the 3 metre springboard competition. Four years later he was eliminated in the first round of the 1928 3 metre springboard event.

References

External links
profile

1897 births
1948 deaths
Swedish male artistic gymnasts
Swedish male divers
Olympic gymnasts of Sweden
Olympic divers of Sweden
Gymnasts at the 1920 Summer Olympics
Divers at the 1924 Summer Olympics
Divers at the 1928 Summer Olympics
Olympic gold medalists for Sweden
Olympic medalists in gymnastics
Medalists at the 1920 Summer Olympics
20th-century Swedish people